Åsgrend is a small parish in the council of Kviteseid, the county of Telemark in the Kingdom of Norway.

Åsgrend is also known as Heggtveit which is also the name of the lower region of the parish.

As of 2017 73 people live in Åsgrend.

In summertime Åsgrend attracts many tourists from all over the world who come to admire the beauty of the peculiar nature of Vestern-Telemark, hiking and fishing.

References

Villages in Vestfold og Telemark
Kviteseid